Jürgen Wolfgang Maier  or Juergen Wolfgang Maier (born 12 January 1964) is a British-Austrian businessman, and the former Chief Executive of Siemens UK. He is an industrialist and business adviser.

Early life
He was born in Germany, though holds Austrian and British citizenship. He lived in Karlsruhe. He came to the UK in 1974, to Leeds, where he went to school at Allerton Grange School, from 1978.

He studied Production Engineering at Trent Polytechnic in Nottingham (now Nottingham Trent University) from 1982 to 1986.

Career
Maier is the Chair of the Digital Catapult and co-founder of vocL, a platform empowering responsible business voices. He also supports development in northern regions and in that capacity is vice-Chair of the Northern Powerhouse Partnership and life time President for the North West Business Leadership Team.

Maier has occupied senior posts with Siemens, including managing director of UK and Ireland industry sector and Manufacturing Director of the Drives Factory in Congleton, Cheshire. He became a member of the Siemens UK Executive Management Board in October 2008, and was appointed Chief Executive on 1 July 2014. He retired in December 2019 at the age of 55.

Honours
He is a Fellow of the Institution of Engineering and Technology (IET) and the Royal Academy of Engineering, and is a visiting professor at the University of Manchester; he has also received Honorary Doctorates from the University of Salford, the University of Lincoln, Nottingham Trent University, the University of Sheffield, Cranfield University and Manchester Metropolitan University.

He was a non-executive board member of the Department for Business, Innovation and Skills (BIS) of the UK government from 2014 to 2016  and led the Made Smarter industrial strategy review and initiative which aims to create a strong 4th Industrial Revolution in the UK. He was a member of the Industrial Strategy Council  which provides impartial and expert advice to government.

In 2019, Insider Magazine named Maier as the most influential business person in North West England. Juergen Maier was ranked number 5 in Glassdoor's Top CEOs for 2019.

He was awarded the CBE in the 2019 New Year Honours and was elected a Fellow of the Royal Society in 2022.

See also
 Austria–United Kingdom relations

References

External links
Biography
Blog

1964 births
Living people
Alumni of Nottingham Trent University
Austrian chief executives
Austrian emigrants to the United Kingdom
Businesspeople from Leeds
Commanders of the Order of the British Empire
Fellows of the Royal Society
Siemens people